Oatman may refer to:

Oatman (surname)
Oatman, Arizona, a former mining town in the Black Mountains of Mohave County, Arizona, United States

See also
Oatman Drug Company Building, a historic building in Oatman, Arizona, United States
Oatman Filling Station, a historic building in Eau Claire, Wisconsin, United States